The 1951 Commonwealth Prime Ministers' Conference was the fifth Meeting of the Heads of Government of the British Commonwealth. It was held in the United Kingdom in January 1951, and was hosted by that country's Prime Minister, Clement Attlee.

The principal topic of the conference was the Korean War with the summit issuing a declaration, proposed by Australian prime minister Robert Menzies, stating that the Commonwealth prime ministers "would welcome any feasible arrangement for a frank exchange of views with Stalin and Mao Tse-tung." The Commonwealth leaders also called for peace treaty negotiations with Japan to be concluded as soon as possible (see Treaty of San Francisco).

Participants

References

1951
Diplomatic conferences in the United Kingdom
20th-century diplomatic conferences
1951 in international relations
1951 in London
United Kingdom and the Commonwealth of Nations
1951 conferences
January 1951 events in the United Kingdom
1950s in the City of Westminster
Clement Attlee
Robert Menzies
Jawaharlal Nehru
Liaquat Ali Khan